A shaker scoop (sometimes called a shaker hood scoop or a shaker hood) is an automobile term for an air intake for combustion air that is mounted directly on top of the engine's air cleaner and protrudes through a hole in the hood.  Since it is fastened directly to the engine, it moves with the engine's movement and vibration on its mountings, thus the 'shaker' name.

Design
Like all such scoops, its purpose is to increase performance by a 'ram air' effect, taking advantage of the vehicle's speed to deliver high pressure, cool air to the engine over a shorter, less restrictive flow path. However, because engines draw air in hundreds of cubic feet per minute, scoops do not raise intake pressures significantly. Additional claimed benefits of a shaker hood include elevation to prevent water from being drawn on flooded terrain, being a source of cooler, denser air, and having a more direct path to the engine's throttle plate.

Aftermarket

Hot rod and drag race enthusiasts have modified automotive engines to increase power via supercharger forced induction since the 1920s; in some cases, a blower scoop is added to the top of the supercharger as an aid to air intake.

A vehicle also can be equipped with an aftermarket engine-mounted scoop that is mounted directly to the carburetor and protrudes through the hood, which is known as a carb scoop. Carb scoops are sometimes mistaken for blower scoops, but the presence (or lack) of a belt to drive the supercharger is one way to distinguish these scoops. Both carb and blower scoops are sometimes called bugcatchers. Like the shaker scoop, both a blower scoop and a carb scoop will vibrate in response to engine motions because they are attached to the engine.

Some aftermarket scoops include butterfly valves, which act as secondary throttle bodies.

Factory-fitted

Larry Shinoda of Ford is credited with introducing the shaker hood scoop as a factory-fitted option and campaigning to make it functional, first available exclusively for the 1969 model year Mustang equipped with the 428 Cobra Jet engine; the option was expanded to other Ford Mustang engines for 1970 and imitated quickly by competitors Chrysler (1970 Plymouth 'cuda and Dodge Challenger) and Pontiac (1970 Firebird Trans Am, which used a backwards-facing scoop to draw air from the high-pressure area at the base of the windshield). Some official Chrysler literature referred to this popular hood style as the "Incredible Quivering Exposed Cold Air Grabber". This lengthy title has since been shortened by enthusiasts and collectors to the less tongue-twisting "shaker hood".

In the 2000s, factory-fitted shaker scoops were reintroduced with the Ford Mustang (2003 Mach 1) and Dodge Challenger (2014 "Shaker" package).

Examples

Such scoops were fitted to a variety of cars, including:
 1969 Ford Mustang Cobra Jet
 1970 Boss 302 Mustang
 1970 Plymouth Barracuda
 Dodge Challenger
 Ford Torino
 Pontiac GTO
 Pontiac Firebird Trans Am
 Pontiac Can Am Grand Am
 Ford Falcon XY GT Phase III
 2004 Ford Mustang Mach 1

References 

Automotive accessories
Automotive styling features